Ralph Sneyd was a Royalist army officer of the English Civil War.

Ralph Sneyd may also refer to:

 Ralph Sneyd (1692–1733), English politician
 Ralph Sneyd (1793–1870), English landowner